Duke of Medina de las Torres is a hereditary title in the Peerage of Spain, accompanied by the dignity of Grandee and granted in 1625 by Philip IV to Gaspar de Guzmán, 3rd Count of Olivares and royal favourite to the king. A few days later, the king granted him the Dukedom of Sanlúcar la Mayor.

The title was created in favor of the first holder to endow his only daughter and heir, María de Guzmán y Zúñiga, to marry Ramiro Núñez de Guzmán, 2nd Marquess of Toral. Upon the death of his daughter, he asked the king to accept his resignation from the dukedom and that it be granted to his son-in-law, who became the 2nd Duke of Medina de las Torres.

Dukes of Sanlúcar la Mayor (1625)

Gaspar de Guzmán y Pimentel, 1st Duke of Medina de las Torres
Ramiro Núñez de Guzmán, 2nd Duke of Medina de las Torres
Nicolás María de Guzmán y Caraffa, 3rd Duke of Medina de las Torres
Mariana Sinforosa de Guzmán y Guevara, 4th Duchess of Medina de las Torres
Antonio Gaspar de Moscoso Osorio y Aragón, 5th Duke of Medina de las Torres
Ventura Antonio de Osorio de Moscoso y Guzmán, 6th Duke of Medina de las Torres
Ventura Osorio de Moscoso y Fernández de Córdoba, 7th Duke of Medina de las Torres
Vicente Joaquín Osorio de Moscoso y Guzmán, 8th Duke of Medina de las Torres
Vicente Isabel Osorio de Moscoso y Álvarez de Toledo, 9th Duke of Medina de las Torres
Vicente Pío Osorio de Moscoso y Ponce de León, 10th Duke of Medina de las Torres
María Eulalia Osorio de Moscoso y Carvajal, 11th Duchess of Sanlúcar la Mayor
Fernando Osorio de Moscoso y López de Ansó, 12th Duke of Sanlúcar la Mayor
José María Ruiz de Bucesta y Osorio de Moscoso, 13th Duke of Sanlúcar la Mayor
José Gonzalo Ruiz de Bucesta y de Mora, 14th Duke of Medina de las Torres

See also
List of dukes in the peerage of Spain
List of current Grandees of Spain

References 

Dukedoms of Spain
Grandees of Spain
Lists of dukes
Lists of Spanish nobility